Bence Zdolik (born 16 May 1992) is a Hungarian handball player for Grundfos Tatabánya KC and the Hungarian national team.

Honours

Individual
 Hungarian Junior Handballer of the Year: 2012, 2013

References

1992 births
Living people
Hungarian male handball players
People from Békéscsaba
Sportspeople from Békés County
21st-century Hungarian people